This article covers the history of London during the Stuart period from 1603 to 1714.

James I

The preparations for the coronation of King James I were interrupted by a severe plague epidemic, which may have killed over thirty thousand people, and threats of assassination; in 1605 the infamous Gunpowder plot occurred, leading to a backlash against Catholics.

The Lord Mayor's Show, which had been discontinued for some years, was revived by order of the king in 1609. The dissolved monastery of the Charterhouse, which had been bought and sold by the courtiers several times, was purchased by Thomas Sutton for £13,000. The new hospital, chapel, and schoolhouse were begun in 1611. Charterhouse School was to be one of the principal public schools in London until it moved to Surrey in the Victorian era, and the site is still used as a medical school.

Charles I
Charles I ascended to the throne in 1625. During his reign aristocrats began to inhabit the West End in large numbers. In addition to those who had specific business at court, increasing numbers of country landowners and their families lived in London for part of the year simply for the social life. This was the beginning of the "London season". Lincoln's Inn Fields, was built about 1629. The piazza of Covent Garden, designed by England's first classically trained architect Inigo Jones followed in about 1632. The neighbouring streets were built shortly afterwards, and the names of Henrietta, Charles, James, King and York Streets were given after members of the royal family.

London and the Civil War
In January 1642 five members of parliament whom the King wished to arrest were granted refuge in the City. In August of the same year King Charles I raised his banner at Nottingham, and during the English Civil War London took the side of the parliament. Initially the king had the upper hand in military terms and in November he won the Battle of Brentford a few miles to the west of London.

The City organised a new makeshift army and Charles hesitated and retreated. Subsequently, an extensive system of fortifications was built to protect London from a renewed attack by the Royalists. This comprised a strong earthen rampart, enhanced with bastions and redoubts. It was well beyond the City walls and encompassed the whole urban area, including Westminster and Southwark. London was not seriously threatened by the royalists again, and the financial resources of the City made an important contribution to the parliamentarians victory in the war.

Cromwellian period

The civil war ended in defeat for the Royalists. The execution of King Charles on 30 January 1649, heralded Oliver Cromwell's short lived Commonwealth.

In contrast to the common view of the period as being one of Puritan repression. Some music and opera flourished in London under Cromwell's patronage. In 1656 The Siege of Rhodes the first true English opera was performed in London.

In 1655 Cromwell allowed Jews to return to London, ending a 365-year banishment. They built their first Synagogue in 1657 at Creechurch Lane.

Following Cromwell's death in 1658. His son Richard took over, but was unable to command the support of parliament and army. The Commonwealth quickly collapsed, and in 1660 the monarchy was restored under Charles II.

The Great Plague

The unsanitary and overcrowded City of London had suffered from numerous outbreaks of the plague many times over the centuries, but in Britain it is the eighth and last outbreak of plague in the 17th century which is remembered as the "Great Plague". The plague first raged in the Netherlands in 1663, which led English authorities to impose a quarantine on Dutch shipping to prevent the spread of the disease to Britain. Despite this, illicit shipping continued, and by November cases of plague were reported in the port of Yarmouth. The severely cold winter of 1664-65 curtailed the flea population from reproducing, so that cases of plague did not occur to any noticeable extent until the spring of 1665. In June the outbreak flared up dramatically around London as the flea population exploded in warm weather (there were 6,137 fatalities that month, compared to just 43 in May). In August the plague moved into the City itself and casualties peaked with an estimated 31,159 deaths. The plague continued to rage through September: 7,165 casualties per week was the official estimate, a rate which was ridiculed by contemporaries for being far short of the real number. Those with the means to do so fled London for the safety of the countryside, including Charles II and his court, which decamped to Salisbury in July and then to Oxford, where the King would remain until February 1666.

In the city, draconian quarantine measures were taken to limit the spread of the plague: at the first sign of an infected inhabitant, an entire house was sealed off from the outside, with the other members of the household forbidden to leave. This deprived people of their ability to earn a wage and feed themselves, and dramatically increased their chances of contracting the plague. The departure of the wealthy meant that collection of the poor-rate in London suffered, limiting the ability of the authorities to provide relief and food for those shut within their homes. Charles II ordered a national collection to be taken in churches, which went a good way towards filling the revenue gap. 

Plague pits were dug on the outskirts of the city which were overwhelmed by the number of dead, (the 20 foot deep "Great Pit" at Aldgate contained 1,114 bodies when it was covered over), and body collection was undertaken house-to-house nightly. Uncertainty over how the plague was transmitted led to the blame being placed on household pets: around 40,000 dogs and 200,000 cats were killed in a general massacre on the orders of the Lord Mayor of London. By late autumn the outbreak would wane with the onset of cold weather, which killed off the disease-transmitting fleas (sporadic cases of the plague would occur into the following summer). The return of the King in February 1666 encouraged other well-off residents to return to London with their households, so that the normal rhythms of city life were largely resumed by spring.

The official number of fatalities in the Great Plague of London was placed at 68,596, roughly 15% of London's population, although many contemporaries were skeptical of this number (the Lord Chancellor, Lord Clarendon, thought the real number was double that of the official rate). Modern estimates place the number at upwards of 100,000, over one quarter of London's total population.

The Great Fire 

On Sunday, 2 September 1666 the Great Fire of London broke out at one o'clock in the morning at a house on Pudding Lane in the southern part of the City. Fanned by a southeasterly wind the fire spread quickly among the timber and thatched-roof buildings, which were primed to ignite after an unusually hot and dry summer. The flames spread to the warehouses near the Tower of London within a couple of hours, packed full of flammable materials like tallow, wine, tar, and pitch. A fireball issued forth into the streets, fanned by the intense wind, which burned 300 houses over the next two hours. The Lord Mayor, Sir Thomas Bloodworth, initially demurred to angry property owners and resisted pulling down houses to create firebreaks, but after the King ordered him to do so on Sunday morning he reluctantly began to oversee demolitions. By this time, however, the fire was out of control, and firebreaks had little effect because of the force of the wind. Fighting the fire was futile because the flames destroyed the network of wooden pipes connected to London's water cisterns, which were already depleted after the dry summer.

By the end of Sunday the whole riverfront between London Bridge and the Tower of London had been consumed by the flames, and the north end of London Bridge was alight. On Monday the fire continued its virtually uninterrupted spread north, west and east - the smoke could be seen as far away as Oxford. During the night four different fires coalesced at the junction of Cheapside, Threadneedle Street and Cornhill, creating "such a dazzling light and burning heat, and roaring noise by the fall of so many houses together, that was very amazing", according to John Evelyn. The King took an active role in coordinating containment and relief - a courier network was established between Whitehall and the burning City to provide constant dispatches. He appointed his brother the Duke of York to command a militia charged with firefighting, which began using gunpowder and military mines to assist in demolition of houses.

On Tuesday night the wind fell somewhat, but the fire reached the apex of its destruction. The flames jumped a firebreak at Mercer's Hall and spread into the wealthy street of Cheapside, moving west until it reached St. Paul's Cathedral, which happened to be covered in scaffolding for repairs. It continued its westward path unabated down Ludgate Hill, jumping the Fleet River and moving up Fleet Street. On Wednesday, the firebreaks created by militias brought in from the countryside began to take effect: the fire was stopped at Fetter Lane and Middle Temple on the western end of the City, while to the north the fire was stopped at Cripplegate and Smithfield. On Thursday it was extinguished, but on the evening of that day the flames again burst forth at the Temple. Some houses were at once blown up by gunpowder, and thus the fire was finally mastered. The fire destroyed about 60% of the City, including Old St Paul's Cathedral, 87 parish churches, 44 livery company halls and the Royal Exchange. An estimated 13,200 houses were destroyed across 400 different streets and courts, leaving 100,000 people homeless. Huge camps of displaced Londoners formed around the City at Moorfields, St. George's Fields in Southwark, and to the north extending as far as Highgate. Despite the destruction, the official death toll was only 4 people, likely an inaccurately low number. Because of London's centrality as a port and financial center, the destruction of the fire affected the entire national economy. Losses were estimated at between £7 and £10 million according to contemporary estimates.

Rebuilding 

For the most idealistic thinkers in Restoration Britain, the Great Fire presented an opportunity to reshape the cityscape of London, creating a more orderly network of streets, broad boulevards, grand vistas, and stately public buildings. Within a few days of the fire, three plans were presented to the king for the rebuilding of the city, by Christopher Wren, John Evelyn and Robert Hooke. Wren proposed to build broad main thoroughfares radiating out from grand piazzas, which would contain churches or public buildings at their center. The grandest of these piazzas would feature the new Royal Exchange at its heart, the anchor of a commercial district of banks and trading houses. The streets would be symmetrical, and the architecture of the public buildings designed in the same Neoclassical style which Wren had admired in Paris and Rome. Wren also wished to build a fine quay on the bank of the river from Blackfriars to the Tower of London. Evelyn's plan differed from Wren's chiefly in proposing a street from the church of St Dunstan's in the East to the St Paul's, and in having no quay or terrace along the river. The cartographer Richard Newcourt submitted a plan for London to be rebuilt in an orderly grid-system interspersed with squares, which would contain churches at their center. All these plans never came to fruition because Parliament and the council of advisors around Charles II, who were under pressure from merchants and businessmen in the City, believed rebuilding as quickly as possible was the imperative. This meant rebuilding along the existing street plan. The schemes of Wren and Evelyn would also have required a significant tax increase to pay for the building and the compensation to property owners in the path of the development, something Parliament was loath to authorize.

Nonetheless, the new City was different from the old one. The King created a Commission for rebuilding in October 1666 (to which Wren was appointed), which had broad powers for enforcing building regulations on new construction. The Rebuilding Act was passed in Parliament in February, 1667, which ensured the new London would be materially and visually much different from its predecessor. The Act required all buildings be constructed in brick or stone, that they not overhang the streets, and that they be limited in height. Houses were divided into four size categories, the grandest houses being restricted to four stories as opposed to the five or six usual before the Fire, while more modest houses were limited to three stories. Certain streets were widened, and a few entirely new streets were created in the City, including King Street, which connected the rebuilt Guildhall to the riverfront. New roads, widened roads, and public buildings were all paid for via a special tax on sea coal (coal shipped in by sea).

Rebuilding proceeded at a robust pace - 1,200 new houses were built within two years, and by 1670 more than 6,000 had been built. Thousands of people were drawn into London from the countryside to provide labor and specialized skills in the rebuilding, largely supplementing the number of those who never returned. This was true of many aristocratic residents, who preferred to take new houses in the West End, where fashionable new districts such as St. James's were built close to the main royal residence, which was Whitehall Palace until it was destroyed by fire in the 1690s, and thereafter St. James's Palace. To an extent this shift was already underway before the Great Fire - residential squares in the West End like Lincoln's Inn Fields were built in the 1630s, and Bloomsbury was in the initial stages of development in 1666 (Bloomsbury Square was laid out in 1665).

Christopher Wren's plan for a new model London came to nothing, but he was appointed to rebuild the ruined parish churches and to replace St Paul's Cathedral. His domed baroque cathedral was the primary symbol of London for at least a century and a half. As city surveyor, Robert Hooke oversaw the reconstruction of the City's houses. The East End, that is the area immediately to the east of the city walls, also became heavily populated in the decades after the Great Fire. London's docks began to extend downstream, attracting many working people who worked on the docks themselves and in the processing and distributive trades. These people lived in Whitechapel, Wapping, Stepney and Limehouse, generally in slum conditions.

Development, culture and trade

London's expansion beyond the boundaries of the City was decisively established in the 17th century. In the opening years of that century the immediate environs of the City, with the principal exception of the aristocratic residences in the direction of Westminster, were still considered insalubrious. Immediately to the north was Moorfields, which had recently been drained and laid out in walks, but it was frequented by beggars and travellers, who crossed it in order to get into London, tried not to linger. Adjoining Moorfields were Finsbury Fields, a favourite practising ground for the archers. Mile End, then a common on the Great Eastern Road, was famous as a rendezvous for the troops.

One important feature of London culture in the late 17th century were the coffeehouses which opened up from the 1650s onwards. The first one was opened on St. Michael's Alley near Cornhill in 1652, with several more opening in the following years. The first coffeehouses were harassed by city authorities as public nuisances and were not very successful, but the 1660s saw their business explode with the Restoration of the monarchy and the development of a lively political culture.  Coffee and tea were novelty refreshments in England, but the purpose of the coffeehouse expanded well beyond serving exotic drinks, to serve as multi-functional venues for socializing, debate, to trade gossip, and conduct business. Coffee houses also functioned as shops where customers could post and receive mail, and also buy the latest books, gazettes, and stationary. In London certain coffeehouses were defined by the professionals who met there to conduct business; some businessmen even maintained regular "office hours" at their coffeehouses of choice. Both Batson's on Cornhill and Garraway's in Change Alley were known for their doctors, surgeons, and apothecaries; the former served as an informal "consulting room" for doctors and their patients. The Grecian was attended by lawyers, The Jerusalem was a meeting place for West Indian traders, and The Baltic on Threadneedle Street likewise was a meeting place for Russian traders. One such business, Lloyd's Coffee House (established 1686), became an exchange for merchants and shipowners, who met there daily to insure ships and cargoes, and to trade intelligence on world trade, shipping disasters, etc. In such a manner the earliest incarnation of the marine insurance giant Lloyd's of London was formed. Other coffeehouses were distinctly political in character: the St. James's on St. James's Street and Old Slaughter's were frequented by Whigs while the Tories and Jacobites preferred the Coffee-Tree on the corner of St. James's Street and Pall Mall.

In the winter of 1683–4 a frost fair was held on the Thames. The frost, which began about seven weeks before Christmas and continued for six weeks after, was the greatest on record. The Revocation of the Edict of Nantes in 1685, led to a large migration on Huguenots to London. They established a silk industry at Spitalfields.

The general meeting-place of Londoners in the day-time was the nave of Old St. Paul's Cathedral. Merchants conducted business in the aisles, and used the font as a counter upon which to make their payments; lawyers received clients at their particular pillars; and the unemployed looked for work. St Paul's Churchyard was the centre of the book trade and Fleet Street was a centre of public entertainment. Under James I the theatre, which established itself so firmly in the latter years of Elizabeth, grew further in popularity. The performances at the public theatres were complemented by elaborate masques at the royal court and at the inns of court.

At this time the City of London was becoming the world's leading financial centre, superseding Amsterdam in primacy. The Bank of England was founded in 1694, and the British East India Company was expanding its influence. In 1700 London handled 80% of England's imports, 69% of its exports and 86% of its re-exports. Many of the goods were luxuries from the Americas and Asia such as silk, sugar, tea and tobacco. The last figure emphasises London's role as an entrepot: while it had many craftsmen in the 17th century, and would later acquire some large factories, its economic prominence was never based primarily on industry. Instead it was a great trading and redistribution centre. Goods were brought to London by England's increasingly dominant merchant navy, not only to satisfy domestic demand, but also for re-export- throughout Europe and beyond.

William III cared little for London, the smoke of which gave him asthma, and after the first fire at Whitehall Palace (1691) he purchased Nottingham House and transformed it into Kensington Palace. Kensington was then an insignificant village, but the arrival of the court soon caused it to grow in importance. The palace was rarely favoured by future monarchs, but its construction was another step in the expansion of the bounds of London. During the same reign Greenwich Hospital, then well outside the boundary of London, but now comfortably inside it, was begun; it was the naval complement to the Chelsea Hospital for former soldiers, which has been founded in 1681. During the reign of Queen Anne an act was passed authorising the building of 50 new churches to serve the greatly increased population living outside the boundaries of the City of London.

See also
History of London
 Timeline of 17th century London

References

Footnotes

Sources

Further reading

External links

History of London by period
17th century in London
Stuart England